"Hawaiʻi Ponoʻī" is the regional anthem of the U.S. state of Hawaii. It previously served as the national anthem of the independent Hawaiian Kingdom during the late 19th century, and has continued to be Hawaii's official anthem ever since annexation by the United States in 1898.

History
The words were written in 1874 by King David Kalākaua with music composed by Captain Henri Berger, then the king's royal bandmaster. "Hawaiʻi Ponoʻī" is one of the national anthems of the Kingdom of Hawaiʻi and also was the National Anthem of the Republic of Hawaiʻi.

It was adopted as the national anthem in 1876, replacing Liliuokalani's composition "He Mele Lāhui Hawaiʻi".  It was the adopted song of the Territory of Hawaiʻi before becoming the state symbol by an act of the Hawaiʻi State Legislature in 1967. The melody is reminiscent of "God Save the King" and the Prussian anthem "Heil dir im Siegerkranz". "Hawaiʻi Ponoʻī" is commonly sung at sporting events in Hawaii, immediately after the U.S. national anthem.

In the Hawaiian language, "Hawaiʻi Ponoʻī" means "Hawaiʻi's Own".

Lyrics

Notes

References

Resources 
 Huapala ~ Hawaiian Music and Hula Archives ~ recording of melody available at website

Symbols of Hawaii
Oceanian anthems
Historical national anthems
Hawaii culture
United States state songs
Hawaiian songs
Songs about Hawaii
1874 in Hawaii
Anthems of non-sovereign states
1874 songs